RIV may refer to:

Anatomy and Medicine 
 Right innominate vein
 Recombinant influenza vaccine

Military aviation 
 March Air Reserve Base, a U.S. Air Reserve base in Riverside County, California, by IATA airport code
 Fieseler Fi 103R Reichenberg, a model of late-World War II German bomber aircraft
 Siemens-Schuckert R.IV, a bomber aircraft built in Germany during World War I
 Zeppelin-Staaken R.IV, a bomber aircraft built in Germany during World War I

Transport
 APG Airlines, by ICAO code
 Registrar of Imported Vehicles, Canada
 , the International Wagon Regulations for European rail freight wagons
 Riversdale railway station, Australia, station code RIV
 Riverside – Downtown station, California, United States, Amtrak station code RIV
 Riviera MRT/LRT station, Punggol, Singapore, station abbreviation RIV

Other uses 
 Augustus Quirinus Rivinus (1652–1723), German physician and botanist, with standard author abbreviation "Riv."
 Rapid intervention vehicle, a type of airport crash tender vehicle
 Residual income valuation, an approach to equity valuation
 Riversdale Mining, Australian Securities Exchange symbole RIV
 Riverside International Raceway, a former automobile race course in Riverside, California
 Riviera (hotel and casino), nicknamed "the Riv", Las Vegas, Nevada, United States
 Rivaan, nicknamed "The Riv", New York City home for the Royal Rooters of Red Sox Nation, a fan club for the Boston Red Sox